This list includes United States senators who switched parties while serving in the Senate.

List

19th century

20th century

21st century

See also
 Party switching in the United States
 List of United States representatives who switched parties
 Party switching
 Crossing the floor

References

Switched parties
Senators Changed parties
United States senators
American politicians who switched parties